Kasol is a hamlet in the Kullu district of the Indian state of Himachal Pradesh. Kasol is the Himalayan hotspot for backpackers and acts as a base for nearby treks to Malana and Kheerganga. It is called Mini Israel of India due to a high percentage of Israeli tourists here.

Climate
Kasol has good weather for several months of the year and receives a fair amount of snowfall from late December to February.
Köppen-Geiger climate classification system classifies its climate as humid subtropical (Cfa).

Festivals
Kasol Music Festival happens in Kasol on New Year's Eve. People from around the world gather for this festival.

External links
 .

References 

Villages in Kullu district